The written Abkhaz literature appeared relatively recently in the beginning of the 20th century although Abkhaz oral tradition is quite rich.

History

Abkhaz share with other Caucasian peoples the Nart sagas — series of tales about mythical heroes, some of which can be considered as creation myths and ancient theology. There also exist historical legends (for example about Marshania princes), brigands' and hunters' songs, satirical songs and songs about the Caucasian War and various ritual songs.

The Abkhaz alphabet was created in the 19th century by Dimitry Gulia and K. Machavariani. Prior to the 1917 revolution in Russia, the only books published in Abkhaz were the alphabet book (Apswa anban), a few other textbooks, and a couple of books by Dmitry Gulia. He published a collection of short poems (Tbilisi, 1912) and a  poem Love letter (Tbilisi, 1913).

The first newspaper in Abkhaz, called Abkhazia (Apsny) and edited by Dmitry Gulia appeared in 1917. It was replaced by the Apsny Kapsh (Аҧсны ҟаҧшь, meaning Red Abkhazia) newspaper after the Soviet rule was established in the country.

A number of new works appeared in the next decades—including Dmitry Gulia's novel Under the foreign skies (1919), about a peasant who took responsibility for his prince's crime and was exiled to Siberia, and Kamachich, (1940) about the pre-revolution life in Abkhazia. Other writers were Samson Chanba (Muhajirs and several other plays), Iua Kogonia (Abkhazian poems, 1924), and Mushni Khashba.

Bagrat Shinkuba was one of the greatest Abkhaz writers and poets. He published his first collections of poems in the 1930s and continued writing until his death in 2004. His Ballad of the rock tells about the fate of Abkhaz "Robin Hood" — Hajarat Kyakhba. His most known work (translated in English and Russian) is the novel The Last of the Departed, dedicated to the tragic destiny of Ubykh nation which became extinct along a hundred of years.

Arguably the most famous Abkhaz writer, Fazil Iskander, wrote mostly in Russian. He was renowned in the former Soviet Union for the vivid descriptions of Caucasian life. He is probably best known in the English-speaking world for Sandro of Chegem, a picturesque novel that recounts life in a fictional Abkhaz village from the early years of the 20th century until the 1970s. This rambling, amusing, and ironic work has been considered as an example of magic realism, although Iskander himself said he "did not care for Latin American magic realism in general".

See also

Notes

Works
Bagrat Shinkuba. The Last of the Departed 
Russian translations of Abkhaz Nartic legends
Nart Sagas from the Caucasus: Myths and Legends from the Circassians, Abazas, Abkhaz, and Ubykhs, assembled, edited and annotated by John Colarusso.

Sources
Абхазская литература. Литературная энциклопедия 1929—1939. (Abkhazian literature. Encyclopaedia of literature 1929-1939) 
Поэт – живописец, поэт – мыслитель. Форум (Forum newspaper), 09.05.07. 

 
Culture of Abkhazia